The "21 Azer" Medal was established in 1946 by the National Government of Azerbaijan. It was awarded to about 20 thousand people who participated in the national-democratic movement of the Southern Azerbaijan. After the fall of the National Government, awarding the medal was suspended.

History 
On 2 December 1945, the National Government of Azerbaijan was proclaimed in the Southern Azerbaijan. This event remained in history as the “21 Azer” movement as the 12 December, according to the Iranian calendar, corresponded to the 21st day of the Azer month.

The newspaper "Azerbaijan", which was the official organ of the Azerbaijan Democratic Party, stated the following about the establishment of the "21 Azer" Medal:

References

Awards of former countries
Orders, decorations, and medals of Azerbaijan
Awards established in 1946